Andreas Floer (23 August 1956 – 15 May 1991) was a German mathematician who made seminal contributions to symplectic topology, and mathematical physics, in particular the invention of Floer homology. Floer's first pivotal contribution was a solution of a special case of Arnold's conjecture on fixed points of a symplectomorphism.  Because of his work on Arnold's conjecture and his development of instanton homology, he achieved wide recognition and was invited as a plenary speaker for the International Congress of Mathematicians held in Kyoto in August 1990.  He received a Sloan Fellowship in 1989.

Life
He was an undergraduate student at the Ruhr-Universität Bochum and received a Diplom in mathematics in 1982. He then went to the University of California, Berkeley, living at Barrington Hall of the Berkeley Student Cooperative, and undertook Ph.D. work on monopoles on 3-manifolds, under the supervision of Clifford Taubes; but he did not complete it when interrupted by his obligatory alternative service in Germany. He received his Dr. rer. nat. at Bochum in 1984, under the supervision of Eduard Zehnder.

In 1988 he became an Assistant Professor at the University of California, Berkeley and was promoted to Full Professor of Mathematics in 1990. From 1990 he was Professor of Mathematics at the Ruhr-Universität Bochum, until his suicide in 1991 as a result of depression.

Quotes
"Andreas Floer's life was tragically interrupted, but his mathematical visions and striking contributions have provided powerful methods which are being applied to problems which seemed to be intractable only a few years ago."

Simon Donaldson wrote: "The concept of Floer homology is one of the most striking developments in differential geometry over the past 20 years. ... The ideas have led to great advances in the areas of low-dimensional topology and symplectic geometry and are intimately related to developments in Quantum Field Theory" and "the full richness of Floer's theory is only beginning to be explored".

"Since its introduction by Andreas Floer in the late nineteen eighties, Floer theory has had a tremendous influence on many branches of mathematics including geometry, topology and dynamical systems. The development of new Floer theoretic tools continues at a remarkable pace and underlies many of the recent breakthroughs in these diverse fields."

Selected publications
Floer, Andreas.  An instanton-invariant for 3-manifolds.  Comm. Math. Phys. 118 (1988), no. 2, 215–240. Project Euclid
Floer, Andreas.  Morse theory for Lagrangian intersections.  J. Differential Geom. 28 (1988), no. 3, 513–547.
Floer, Andreas.  Cuplength estimates on Lagrangian intersections. Comm. Pure Appl. Math. 42 (1989), no. 4, 335–356.

Posthumous publications
Hofer, Helmut.  Coherent orientation for periodic orbit problems in symplectic geometry (jointly with A. Floer) Math. Zeit. 212, 13–38, 1993.
Hofer, Helmut.  Symplectic homology I: Open sets in C^n (jointly with A. Floer) Math. Zeit. 215, 37–88, 1994.
Hofer, Helmut.  Applications of symplectic homology I (jointly with A. Floer and K. Wysocki) Math. Zeit. 217, 577–606, 1994.
Hofer, Helmut.  Symplectic homology II: A General Construction (jointly with K. Cieliebak and A. Floer) Math. Zeit. 218, 103–122, 1995.
Hofer, Helmut.  Transversality results in the elliptic Morse theory of the action functional (jointly with A. Floer and D. Salamon) Duke Mathematical Journal, Vol. 80 No. 1, 251–292, 1995.  Download from H. Hofer's homepage at NYU
Hofer, Helmut.  Applications of symplectic homology II (jointly with K. Cieliebak, A. Floer and K. Wysocki) Math. Zeit. 223, 27–45, 1996.

Notes
  Hofer, Weinstein, and Zehnder, Andreas Floer: 1956-1991, Notices Amer. Math. Soc. 38 (8), 910-911
Simon Donaldson, Floer Homology Groups in Yang-Mills Theory, With the assistance of M. Furuta and D. Kotschick. Cambridge Tracts in Mathematics, 147. Cambridge University Press, Cambridge, 2002. viii+236 pp.  (The above citation is from the front flap.)
Mathematics: frontiers and perspectives. Edited by V. Arnold, M. Atiyah, P. Lax and B. Mazur. American Mathematical Society, Providence, RI, 2000. xii+459 pp.  (Amazon search)
 From the Press Release to the Workshop New Applications and Generalizations of Floer Theory of the Banff International Research Station (BIRS), May 2007

Further reading
Simon Donaldson, On the work of Andreas Floer, Jahresber. Deutsch. Math.-Verein. 95 (3) (1993), 103-120.
The Floer Memorial Volume (H. Hofer, C. Taubes, A. Weinstein, and E. Zehnder, eds.), Progress in Mathematics, vol. 133, Birkhauser Verlag, 1995.
Simon Donaldson, Floer Homology Groups in Yang-Mills Theory, With the assistance of M. Furuta and D. Kotschick. Cambridge Tracts in Mathematics, 147. Cambridge University Press, Cambridge, 2002. viii+236 pp.

References

External links

The In Memoriam website of the Department of Mathematics at the University of California, Berkeley
The In Memoriam website of the University of California, Berkeley
Elaborate obituary by Addison/Casson/Weinstein at OAC, Online Archive of California, 1992
 For images, see Wikimedia Commons Category:Andreas Floer and a public Andreas Floer photo album on Facebook
 Video of Andreas Floer giving a lecture on the Arnold Conjecture, Stony Brook 1986 (access forbidden; 2021-Jul-16). YouTube alternative
 Introduction to Floer Theory. Lecture by Dusa McDuff 2010
 Introduction to Floer Theory? at mathoverflow.net

Topologists
1956 births
1991 suicides
University of California, Berkeley alumni
University of California, Berkeley faculty
20th-century German mathematicians
Suicides in Germany
Berkeley Student Cooperative alumni